Extortionist is an American deathcore band formed in Idaho in 2013. The band consists of vocalist Ben Hoagland, guitarist Juan Hernandez III, bassist Kip Treeman, guitarist Jared Suku, and drummer Dominic Guggino.

In 2014, the band signed to We Are Triumphant, releasing their debut EP, The Black Sheep on March 25 of that year. On February 17, 2017, the band released their debut full-length studio album, The Decline. On March 22, 2019, their sophomore album Sever The Cord, was released through Stay Sick Records. The same year, the band released their self-titled second EP, Extortionist on May 24, 2019.

The band split after their final show on October 5, 2019.  The band reunited in 2020, and immediately began writing new music, releasing the single "Once More in Torment" on October 5, 2021, exactly 2 years after their initial split.

History

The Decline (2017–2019)

On February 17, 2017, the band released their debut album, "The Decline". The album was received well. It was recorded, mixed, and mastered by Calvin Russell of DJSM Studios.

On August 30, 2018, drummer Nick Mayhew and guitarist Mac Rockwell left the band while on tour with The Last Ten Seconds of Life and So This is Suffering. Due to them being short two members, they were unable to complete the tour.

Sever The Cord and Self-Titled (2019–present)

In early 2019, the band announced their sophomore album "Sever The Cord", which was released through Stay Sick Records on March 22 of that year. The album was received well, with Connor Welsh of New Transcendence giving it a 9 out of 10, while Metal Noise gave it a 7 out of 10. It was mixed and mastered by Mike Sahm of Dream Awake Studios.

Two months later, they released their self-titled EP, "Extortionist", on May 24, 2019. The EP was written in 2018 by Hoagland and Rockwell, but was released later after Rockwell left. They agreed that the EP should be released, and the funds from the release went towards suicide prevention.

On July 22, 2019, the band released a statement on their social media that they would be breaking up. They played their final tour on October 5, 2019, with Distinguisher, Dead Crown, and Straight to our Enemies in Spokane, Washington.

On July 8, 2020, the band quietly got back together and began teasing new material and asking fans what music they should make.
On October 5, 2021, the band released their new single "Once More in Torment", exactly 2 years after they initially split. In 2022, they have been working on new music.

Musical style and influences

Extortionist have been categorized as nu metal, beatdown hardcore, and deathcore.

They are known for their signature "pangy" open snare and "dodgeball sound", which is made by slamming a metal beer keg with a baseball bat. Along with this, they incorporate heavy, downtuned guitars and aggressive growls with some occasional grunge-style bridges and choruses.

Band members
Current members
 Ben Hoagland – lead vocals (2013–2019, 2020-present), guitar (2013)
 Jared (Crimewave) Suku – guitar (2014-2017, 2020–present)
 Kip Treeman – guitar (2014-2018), bass (2018-2019, 2020-present)
 Juan Hernandez III – guitar (2016-2019, 2020–present)
 Dominic Guggino – drums (2018-2019, 2020-present)
 Clayton Blue - guitar (2022-present)

Former members

 Carl Schulz - guitar (2019)
 Mac Rockwell - guitar / vocals (2017–2018)
 Nick Mayhew - drums (2017–2018)
 Rob Gibbs – drums (2015-2018)
 Joel Omans - guitar (2013-2014, 2017)
 Riker Morrow – bass (2013-2018)
 AJ Nussbaum – bass (2013)
 Jonathan Chase – bass (2013)
 Sky Collins – guitar (2013–2014)
 Dylan Chandler – drums (2013, 2013-2015), bass (2013)
 Adam Prince - lead vocals (2013)

Timeline

Discography

Studio albums
 The Decline (2017)
 Sever the Cord (2019)

EPs
 The Black Sheep (2014)
 Extortionist (2019)

References

External links
Bandcamp
Dreamwake Audio

Musical groups established in 2013
Musical groups from Idaho
American deathcore musical groups
American nu metal musical groups